The M29 is an American-produced 81 millimeter mortar. It began replacing the M1 mortar in U.S. service in 1952 being lighter and with greater range. It was subsequently replaced by the M252 mortar in 1987. Variants included the M29E1 and M29A1, adopted in 1964. These were produced with a hard chrome-plated bore to prolong barrel life and ease of cleaning.

The maximum rate of fire is 30 rounds for the first minute followed by 4 to 12 rounds per additional minute. The weapon was usually serviced by a crew of five. The normal crew consisted of a squad leader, a gunner, an assistant gunner and two ammunition bearers.

Users 

 : designated as 8.1 cm GrW M29/65
 
 
 
 
 
 
 
 
 
 
 
 
 
 
 
 
 
 
 : Howa produced a modified version of the M29A1 as Type 64
 
 : produced under license by Daewoo as KM29A1

References

External links

Infantry mortars
Mortars of the United States
81mm mortars